Burj Bank Limited, formerly known as Dawood Islamic Bank Limited (DIBL), now merged into Al Baraka Bank, was Pakistan's sixth full-fledged Islamic commercial bank. The bank received its license from the State Bank of Pakistan in May 2006, and officially commenced its operations on Friday, April 27, 2007.

The bank was the result of an initiative of the First Dawood Group, with the Islamic Corporation for the Development of the Private Sector (ICD) in Jeddah, Unicorn Investment Bank in Bahrain, Al Safat Investment Company in Kuwait, Gargash Enterprises (LLC) in Dubai, the Singapore-based entrepreneur Azam Essof Kolia and Shaikh Abdullah Mohammad Al-Romaizan, an entrepreneur from the Kingdom of Saudi Arabia. In July 2011, the bank was renamed Burj Bank.

Mufti Muneeb-ur-Rehman was heading Shariah Department of the Bank as the bank’s Shariah advisor. It currently has 75 online branches.

Burj Bank has a diversified range of shariah-compliant funded and non-funded products and services aimed at both individual and corporate customers.  The bank also offers investment and corporate advisory services.

Burj Bank merged into the Al Baraka Bank in 2016.

References

External links

Official website

Islamic banks of Pakistan
Defunct banks of Pakistan
Banks disestablished in 2016
Mergers and acquisitions of Pakistani companies
Pakistani companies disestablished in 2016